Sheatfish may refer to the following catfish:
Siluridae species
The Wels (Silurus glanis)
Micronema species
Phalacronotus species
Wallago species